Raúl Bravo Sanfélix (born 14 April 1981) is a Spanish footballer who plays for UD Beniopa. Mainly a left-back, he can also play in the centre.

Having played in almost all the youth ranks at Real Madrid, he went on to have a six-year spell in the first team, where he almost always served as a backup; however, it was during that period that he reached the Spain national side, representing them at Euro 2004.

Bravo also spent several years in Greece, most notably with Olympiacos where he won six major titles including three national championships.

Club career

Real Madrid
Bravo was born in Gandia, Valencian Community. After playing in his early years with two local clubs, he joined Real Madrid's youth system at 16. He was subsequently part of the Junior A side, and played for them two more seasons before arriving at the C team in Tercera División, moving to Real Madrid Castilla in Segunda División B for 2001–02.

International call-ups of some players in the first team gave Bravo the chance for a La Liga debut against Athletic Bilbao at the Santiago Bernabéu, on 6 October 2001, and he played 70 minutes in a 2–0 win. He ended up training with them – under Vicente del Bosque's management – very often, which eventually led to his permanent stay from the 2002–03 campaign onwards.

In January 2003, Bravo started an unsuccessful six-month loan spell at Leeds United. During Euro 2004, in which he appeared for Spain, Mick McCarthy, whilst commentating for the BBC, remarked that he looked a different player to the one in his Elland Road stint; Roberto Carlos' presence, however, restricted his playing time in the Real main squad.

Olympiacos
With a chance to retain UEFA Champions League status, Bravo signed a four-year contract with Olympiacos F.C. in mid-July 2007, with the transfer fee estimated in the region of €2.3 million while the player received an annual salary of €1.3 million. After having appeared rarely due to injuries, he had a short return to Spain in the 2009 January transfer window, moving on loan to top-tier strugglers CD Numancia and having almost no impact in a relegation-ending campaign.

Bravo showed a much higher commitment than in the previous year with Olympiacos and, thanks to his performances in preseason, earned the starting left-back position over Didier Domi and Leonardo. He was released in May 2011 at the age of 30, after having contributed 18 matches to the conquest of the Super League Greece.

Later years
On 31 August 2011, Bravo returned to his country and Madrid, signing for Rayo Vallecano which had just promoted to the top division. In the following off-season, after having been rarely played in his first and only season, he joined Beerschot A.C. in Belgium for one year.

Aged 33, Bravo returned to the Greek top flight, moving to Veria FC. His contract expired on 30 June 2015 and, two months later, he agreed to a one-year deal with Aris Thessaloniki F.C. also in the country.

International career
Bravo was capped for Spain on the under-16 level in 1997–98, when the national team won the Algarve Tournament. With the under-17s he played in the Nymburk International Tournament, scoring two goals in three matches.

Bravo's full debut was on 21 August 2002 against Hungary, in a friendly. Subsequently, he was a participant at UEFA Euro 2004, playing every minute in Spain's group stage exit campaign, against Portugal, Russia and eventual champions Greece (always as a stopper); he was not recalled since, receiving a total of 14 caps.

Controversy
On 28 May 2019, Bravo was arrested on charges of belonging to a criminal organisation, involved in corruption and money laundering. The investigation regarded match fixing during the 2016–17 and 2017–18 campaigns. The following January he was accused by Serbian tabloid newspaper Telegraf of hiring a contract killer to murder his former Olympiacos teammate Darko Kovačević, which he vehemently denied, commenting: "It's a crazy story, it's nonsense."

Career statistics

Club

International

Honours
Real Madrid
La Liga: 2002–03, 2006–07
Supercopa de España: 2003
UEFA Champions League: 2001–02
UEFA Super Cup: 2002

Olympiacos
Super League Greece: 2007–08, 2008–09, 2010–11
Greek Football Cup: 2007–08

References

External links

1981 births
Living people
People from Gandia
Sportspeople from the Province of Valencia
Spanish footballers
Footballers from the Valencian Community
Association football defenders
La Liga players
Segunda División players
Segunda División B players
Tercera División players
Divisiones Regionales de Fútbol players
CF Gandía players
Real Madrid C footballers
Real Madrid Castilla footballers
Real Madrid CF players
CD Numancia players
Rayo Vallecano players
Córdoba CF players
Premier League players
Leeds United F.C. players
Super League Greece players
Football League (Greece) players
Olympiacos F.C. players
Veria F.C. players
Aris Thessaloniki F.C. players
Belgian Pro League players
Beerschot A.C. players
UEFA Champions League winning players
Spain youth international footballers
Spain under-21 international footballers
Spain international footballers
UEFA Euro 2004 players
Spanish expatriate footballers
Expatriate footballers in England
Expatriate footballers in Greece
Expatriate footballers in Belgium
Spanish expatriate sportspeople in England
Spanish expatriate sportspeople in Greece
Spanish expatriate sportspeople in Belgium